Rohit Raj (born 3 December 1993) is an Indian cricketer. He made his List A debut for Bihar in the 2018–19 Vijay Hazare Trophy on 19 September 2018.

References

External links
 

1993 births
Living people
Indian cricketers
Bihar cricketers
Place of birth missing (living people)